Phoenicia University (PU; Arabic: جامعة فينيسيا) is a private non-sectarian institution of higher education, with its main campus located in Daoudiye, the district of Zahrani, Southern Governorate of Lebanon, only a 40-minute drive from Beirut International Airport. It was founded in 2012 under Decree No. 9089 as Phoenicia University International.

History
Phoenicia University was founded in 2012. The location in the south of Lebanon was chosen for the needs of the growing labor market in the region, from where students would previously have had to travel to Beirut or another major city, with a higher cost of living. Construction finished in the summer of 2015, and the first 5 of the university's 6 schools began teaching. In the university's first year, it accepted 450 students from 1,200 applications.

Campus
The main campus of Phoenicia University is located in the district of Zahrani in the Southern Governorate on a land of approximately 25 acres, and is complemented by an Administrative Office in the Beirut Central District that also serves as the university’s Executive Education Center.

In addition to classrooms and offices, the main campus provides facilities including libraries, labs, residential accommodation, commercial space, sports courts, a gym, chapel and prayer room.

Colleges
The University is licensed to operate six colleges with a total of 17 degree programs. The colleges of Engineering, Business Administration, Law and Political Science, Arts and Sciences, and Public Health began operating in the university's first year. The college of Architecture began teaching in September 2016.

Curriculum
Phoenicia University is well-known for its student-centered exemplary education models across its colleges, high-tech labs and facilities, and the range of services and support offered. Project-based learning (PBL) and learning in the workplace and community (LiWC) are among the many notable models implemented at PU, allowing students to construct knowledge, develop their skills and capabilities, and apply theories to real-life settings at the workplace and community. At PU, students thinking locally, nationally, and globally when approaching and addressing various tasks and issues.  The University also offers a number of extra-curricular activities and various leisure facilities, complementing and nurturing PU students’ academic experiences.

References

http://www.pu.edu.lb/

Universities in Lebanon
2012 establishments in Lebanon
Educational institutions established in 2012